Paraulacizes irrorata, the speckled sharpshooter, is a species of sharpshooter in the family Cicadellidae.
 They lay eggs in woody twigs, stems, or petioles, and their eggs can become infected by Gonatocerus fasciatus, which acts as a parasitoid.

References

Further reading

External links

 

Insects described in 1794
Proconiini